22 Weymouth Street is a grade II listed building in Weymouth Street, London, in the City of Westminster. The house was built in 1934 by Bovis Ltd to a design by Giles Gilbert Scott and his brother Adrian Gilbert Scott. It is notable for the combination of traditional and modernist architectural elements.

References

Grade II listed buildings in the City of Westminster
Grade II listed houses in London
Houses completed in 1934
Houses in the City of Westminster
Buildings and structures in Marylebone
Modernist architecture in London
Giles Gilbert Scott buildings
Adrian Gilbert Scott buildings
1934 establishments in England